George W. Parrish (born 1928)  is a retired NASCAR Grand National driver from Henderson, North Carolina, USA.

Career summary
Parrish has earned a grand total of $1,150 ($ when adjusted for inflation) through his entire NASCAR Grand National Series career and was a participant of the 1955 Southern 500 which has been recorded on VHS and DVD.

His average career start was 23rd while his average career finish was also 23rd. This means that Parrish was very consistent throughout his racing career. Parrish all of his NASCAR races using a Studebaker; he even first gained his official competition license in a 1953 Studebaker Commander coupé with the racing number 11. The 1955 Richmond 200 was the site of Parrish's only top ten finish during his entire career (he would finish in tenth place and twenty-four laps behind the winner). Joe Frazier (no relation to the heavyweight boxer) was Parrish's sponsor for his entire career.

References

1928 births
NASCAR drivers
People from Henderson, North Carolina
Living people
Racing drivers from North Carolina